Korenovsk is an airbase of the Russian Air Force located near Korenovsk, Krasnodar Krai, Russia.

The base is home to the 55th Independent Helicopter Regiment.

References

Russian Air Force bases